Lanier High School is a public high school located in Jackson, Mississippi, United States. It is part of the Jackson Public School District. The current principal is Valerie Bradley. There were a total of 872 students enrolled in Lanier High during the 2006–2007 school year. The gender makeup of the district was 52% female and 48% male. The racial makeup of the school is 100% African American.

History
Lanier was founded in 1925 as a junior and senior high school. It was named after William Henry Lanier (1855–1929), who was superintendent of black schools in Jackson from 1912 until his death. Due to segregation, Lanier was reserved for black students until 1969, when Jackson schools were integrated by law.

Feeder pattern
The following schools feed into Lanier High School.

Middle schools
Brinkley Middle School
Elementary schools
Dawson Elementary School
Galloway Elementary School
Johnson Elementary School
Smith Elementary School
Walton Elementary School

Notable alumni
Lerone Bennett Jr., author and social historian
 Monta Ellis, former NBA player
 Daryl Jones (born 1955), (Democratic politician) in Miami, Florida
 Arvesta Kelly, ABA basketball player
 Richard Wright, renowned African-American author; attended Lanier but dropped out to earn money for his family
, former NFL player; graduated from the now feeder school of Brinkley High School, Brinkley Middle School

References

External links

 Official website

Public high schools in Mississippi
Schools in Jackson, Mississippi